COVID-19 pandemic in Saint Martin may refer to:

 COVID-19 pandemic in the Collectivity of Saint Martin, the French part of the island
 COVID-19 pandemic in Sint Maarten, the Dutch part of the island